Lachlan Rose (born 10 May 1999) is an Australian professional footballer who plays as a forward for A-League club Macarthur FC.

Club career
New A-League club Macarthur announced the signing of Rose for their inaugural 2020–21 A-League season in November 2020. He debuted for the club starting in their first ever A-League game against Western Sydney Wanderers on 30 December 2020, having a goal ruled offside. In March 2021, after playing in eight out of a possible ten league matches, Macarthur extended Rose's contract for another two years.

Career statistics

Honours
Macarthur
Australia Cup: 2022

References

External links
 

Living people
1999 births
Australian soccer players
Association football forwards
A-League Men players
Macarthur FC players